The Ambulance Service Medal (ASM) is awarded for distinguished service by a member of an Australian ambulance service. The ASM was introduced in 1999.

Awards are made by the Governor-General, on the nomination of the responsible minister in each state and territory.  The total number of awards made each year must not exceed the following quota:
 one award for each 1,000, or part of 1,000, full-time permanent members of a state's ambulance service
 one award for each 5,000, or part of 5,000, part-time, volunteer or auxiliary members in a state
 one award for ambulance members in each of the ACT, NT and the combined External Territories.

Recipients of the Ambulance Service Medal are entitled to use the post-nominal letters "ASM".

Description
 The Ambulance Service Medal is circular and of silver and bronze tones. The front of the medal displays the Federation Star superimposed on a modified Maltese cross, which is representative of ambulance services. This rests on a bed of Australian wattle. The Federation Star is surrounded by twenty-four balls signifying the twenty-four hours per day the Ambulance Service is available to the community.
 The back of the medal bears the inscription ‘For Distinguished Service’.
 The 32 millimetre-wide ribbon features a chevron or V-shaped pattern. The angles are derived from the open end of the arm of the cross. The chevrons are in alternate red, white, red, silver-grey.

See also
Australian Honours Order of Precedence

References
It's an Honour Australian Government website

Civil awards and decorations of Australia
1999 establishments in Australia
Awards established in 1999
Long and Meritorious Service Medals of Britain and the Commonwealth